Kassim M'Dahoma (born 26 January 1997) is a professional footballer who plays as a defender for Romanian Liga I club Botoșani. Born in France, he represents the Comoros national team internationally.

Club career

Youth career
M'Dahoma spent one season with FC Côte Bleu before moving to the academy of GS Consolat in 2015.

Boulogne
He spent two seasons playing for the senior side in Championnat National, before joining divisional rivals US Boulogne in July 2018.

Bourg-Péronnas
He went on to join Bourg-Péronnas in August 2019.

Sporting Club Lyon
In September 2020 he moved clubs within the Championnat National again, signing for Sporting Club Lyon.

Avranches
In August 2021, Avranches announced the signing of M'Dahoma.

Botoșani
On 7 October 2022, M'Dahoma agreed to a two-year deal at Romanian Liga I club Botoșani.

International career
M'Dahoma made his international debut for the Comoros national team in a friendly 2–0 loss to Togo on 4 July 2017.

International stats

References

External links
 
 
 

1997 births
Living people
French sportspeople of Comorian descent
Citizens of Comoros through descent
Comorian footballers
French footballers
Footballers from Marseille
Association football defenders
Comoros international footballers
2021 Africa Cup of Nations players
Championnat National players
Championnat National 3 players
Athlético Marseille players
US Boulogne players
Football Bourg-en-Bresse Péronnas 01 players
Lyon La Duchère players
US Avranches players
Liga I players
FC Botoșani players
Expatriate footballers in Romania
Comorian expatriate sportspeople in Romania